The Willy Street Cooperative (locally known as the Willy Street Co-op) is a food cooperative located in Madison, Wisconsin that specializes in natural, organic and locally produced foods. The co-op offers products from over 180 local farmers and vendors. The cooperative is owned by over 31,000 equity-owning members.

The co-op is an economically and environmentally sustainable, cooperatively owned grocery business that serves the needs of its owners and employees. WSGC supports local and organic suppliers throughout south-central Wisconsin. It operates according to seven basic principles, sometimes known as the Rochdale Principles. The cooperative has assisted struggling cooperatives such as the Yahara River Grocery Cooperative in Stoughton.

History
The Williamson Street Grocery Co-op opened in 1974 at 1101 Williamson Street, sharing the space with the workers cooperative Nature's Bakery. The co-op relocated to 1014 Williamson Street in October 1974. They outgrew the space and relocated again in October 1977 to 1202 Williamson Street. A board of directors was elected from the membership in 1979. Originally managed as a collective, the staff was restructured in 1982 and a general manager was hired.

Willy Street Co-op grew over the next two decades; then, in 1998, the co-op purchased and remodeled the Eagles Club at 1221 Williamson Street. After years of planning and selecting two sites that didn't work out, the cooperative opened a second store, dubbed "Willy West," at 6825 University Avenue in Middleton in November 2010. Willy Street Co-op opened their third store, Willy North, located at 2817 North Sherman Avenue, in August 2016.

Scenes from the comedy series Chad Vader: Day Shift Manager were filmed on location at the Willy Street Co-op, which serves as "Empire Market," the primary location for the series.

See also
 List of food cooperatives

References

External links
 Official website

Organizations established in 1974
Food cooperatives in the United States
Organic food retail organizations
Supermarkets of the United States
Companies based in Madison, Wisconsin
1974 establishments in Wisconsin